{{DISPLAYTITLE:Xi2 Centauri}}

Xi2 Centauri, Latinized from ξ2 Centauri, is a triple star system in the southern constellation of Centaurus. It is visible to the naked eye with an apparent visual magnitude of 4.30, and forms a wide optical double with the slightly dimmer ξ1 Centauri. Based upon an annual parallax shift of 6.98 mas, Xi2 Centauri lies roughly 470 light years from the Sun. At that distance, the visual magnitude is diminished by an interstellar extinction factor of 0.32 due to intervening dust.

This system was discovered to be a single-lined spectroscopic binary in 1910 by American astronomer Joseph Haines Moore. The pair, component A, orbit each other with a period of 7.6497 days and an eccentricity of 0.35. The primary is a B-type star with a stellar classification of B1.5 V or B2 IV, depending on the source. This indicates it may be a main sequence star or a more evolved subgiant star. It has about 8.1 times the mass of the Sun and radiates 1,702 times the solar luminosity from its outer atmosphere at an effective temperature of 20,790 K. It is a hybrid pulsator and shows spacings in both g and p modes.

A third star, component B, is a magnitude 9.38 F-type main sequence star with a classification of F7 V. It has 1.25 times the mass of the Sun and radiates 2.4 times the solar luminosity at an effective temperature of 6,194 K. It lies at an angular separation of 25.1 arc seconds from the inner pair. They share a common proper motion, indicating they may be gravitationally bound with an orbital period of around 41,000 years.

It belongs to the Scorpius–Centaurus association and appears to be a member of the Gould's Belt.

References

External links
http://server3.wikisky.org/starview?object_type=1&object_id=884

B-type main-sequence stars
F-type main-sequence stars
Centauri, Xi2
Spectroscopic binaries
Triple star systems
Centaurus (constellation)
Durchmusterung objects
113791
064004
4942
Scorpius–Centaurus association